Godzilla, also known as Gojira, is a fictional Japanese monster.

Godzilla may also refer to:

Film
 Godzilla (franchise), the franchise featuring the monster
 Godzilla (1954 film), also known as Gojira, the first film in the series
 "Godzilla (Main Theme)", a musical theme composed for the 1954 film
 The Return of Godzilla, 1984, released in Japan as Godzilla, the sixteenth film in the series
 Godzilla 1985, 1985 English-language adaptation of the 1984 Japanese film, The Return of Godzilla
 Godzilla (1998 film), 1998 film produced by TriStar Pictures
 Godzilla 2000, also known as Godzilla 2000: Millennium, the twenty-third film in the series
 Godzilla (2014 film), 2014 film produced by Legendary Pictures
 Godzilla (MonsterVerse), the MonsterVerse version of the character.
 Zilla (Godzilla), the iteration of the character from the 1998 film Godzilla.

Television
 Godzilla (1978 TV series), a 1978–1979 American animated television series from Hanna-Barbera that aired on NBC
 Godzilla Island, a 1997–1998 Japanese children's television series in which Godzilla and various other Daikaiju are brought to life as Bandai toys
 Godzilla: The Series, a 1998–2000 American-Japanese animated television series that aired on Fox Kids

Video games and pinball
 Godzilla video games
 Godzilla (1983 video game)
 Godzilla (Game Boy), a 1990 video game for the Game Boy
 Godzilla (2014 video game)

Literature
 Godzilla (comic), since the 1950s, comic books based on the films
 Godzilla (Scott Ciencin series), starting in 1996, a series of children's novels
 Godzilla (Marc Cerasini series), starting in 1996, a series of novels based on the film characters

Godzilla Rock
 Godzilla Rock (Oga), a natural creation in Oga, Akita, Japan
 Godzilla Rock (Suzu), a natural creation in Suzu, Ishikawa, Japan
 Godzilla Rock (Shari), a natural creation in Shari, Hokkaido, Japan
 Godzilla Rock (Ōshima, Tokyo), a natural creation in Izu Ōshima, Japan

Music
"Godzilla" (Blue Öyster Cult song), 1977
 "Godzilla" (Eminem song), 2020
"Godzilla!", a 2003 song by The Creatures
"Godzilla", a song by The Doubleclicks from their 2014 album Dimetrodon
"Godzilla", a song by Feeder from their 2002 album Comfort in Sound
Gojira (band), a French heavy metal band formerly known as Godzilla
Godzilla, a 1997 EP by Fu Manchu
Godzilla (Yukmouth album), a 2003 album by Yukmouth
Godzilla (The Veronicas album), a 2021 album by the Veronicas
 Godzilla Entertainment, a 2003 record label founded by rapper Yukmouth 
Godzilla (singer) (1988–2019), Tanzanian singer

Other uses
 Dakosaurus andiniensis, an extinct species of marine crocodilian
 Ford Godzilla engine a V8 engine offered by the Ford Motor Company
 Godzillus robustus,  a species of remiped discovered by Frederick Schram et al. 
 Gojirasaurus, a dinosaur from the Triassic period
 Godzilla Asian American Arts Network
 Godzillatron, a scoreboard at the University of Texas
 Godzilla Game, a 1978 Mattel board game
 Godzilla, a fictional monster in the online game Rappelz
 Hideki Matsui, a baseball player with the popular nickname "Godzilla"
 Nissan Skyline GT-R and GT-R, two Japanese sports cars nicknamed "Godzilla"
 Godzilla, name given by marine geologists to a hydrothermal vent in the Pacific
 Godzilla Star, a Luminous blue variable (LBV) star in the Sunburst galaxy, currently the most luminous known star.

See also
 Gojira (disambiguation)